Sickhead Games, LLC is an American independent game development studio founded in 2002. It is best known for its multiplatform turn-based strategy game ARMED!, its involvement with the MonoGame framework and Torque series of game engines, and the development of several PlayStation 4, PlayStation Vita, Xbox One, and Nintendo Switch ports of indie games including TowerFall Ascension, Stardew Valley, Darkest Dungeon, Octodad: Dadliest Catch, and Axiom Verge.

Games
This is a list of the original video game titles developed by Sickhead Games.

Game Ports
This is a list of video game titles ported to various platforms by Sickhead Games.

References

External links
 Sickhead Games website
 MonoGame website

2002 establishments in Texas
Video game companies based in Texas
Companies based in Dallas
Indie video game developers
Video game companies established in 2002